Maisel Bräu Bamberg was a brewery founded in 1894 in Bamberg, Bavaria, Germany . They closed in 2008.

Beer
The brewery produced a range of beers including Maisel Kellerbier and Maisel Eine Bamberger Weisse.

External links
RateBeer
 Maisel Bräu Bamberg

Beer and breweries in Bavaria
Beer brands of Germany
Companies based in Bavaria
1894 establishments in Bavaria
Food and drink companies established in 1894
Food and drink companies disestablished in 2008
German companies disestablished in 2008
German companies established in 1894
Breweries in Germany
Defunct breweries
Defunct food and drink companies of Germany